Brodie Ainslie (10 August 1891 – 17 December 1944) was an Australian rules footballer who played for St Kilda in the Victorian Football League (VFL).

Ainslie played one match for St Kilda in 1911 and scored no goals.

He served in both the Australian Imperial Force (7th Battalion) during World War I and the Second Australian Imperial Force during World War II.

He died suddenly in 1944, six months after being discharged.

References

External links

1891 births
St Kilda Football Club players
Australian rules footballers from Melbourne
Australian military personnel of World War I
Australian Army personnel of World War II
1944 deaths
People from Armadale, Victoria
Military personnel from Melbourne